Stigmella symmora is a moth of the family Nepticulidae. It is only known from the southern Gulf coast of South Australia.

The wingspan is 5.2-5.7 mm for males and 5–6 mm for females.

The larvae probably feed on Dodonaea viscosa. They mine the leaves of their host plant.

External links
Australian Faunal Directory
Australian Nepticulidae (Lepidoptera): Redescription of the named species

Nepticulidae
Moths of Australia
Moths described in 1906